Willy Vanden Berghen (3 July 1939 – 30 March 2022) was a Belgian professional road bicycle racer. In 1960 he won two bronze medals in the road race, one at the amateur world championships and the other at the Olympic Games.

Major results

1958
Gent-Staden
1959
 national amateur track pursuit championship
Schaal Sels-Merksem
1960
GP de la Famenne
Heist-op-den-Berg
Ronde van Vlaanderen for amateurs
 Olympic Road Race
Braine-le-Comte
Waarschoot
1961
Buggenhout
Ronde van Oost-Vlaanderen
Jambes
1962
GP Monaco
Machelen
Sint-Lambrechts-Woluwe
Tour de France:
Winner stage 4
1963
Tienen
Petegem-aan-de-Leie

References

External links 
 
Official Tour de France results for Willy van den Berghen

1939 births
2022 deaths
Belgian male cyclists
Belgian Tour de France stage winners
Cyclists at the 1960 Summer Olympics
Olympic bronze medalists for Belgium
Olympic cyclists of Belgium
People from Vilvoorde
Olympic medalists in cycling
Medalists at the 1960 Summer Olympics
Cyclists from Flemish Brabant